Pedro Alcañiz Martínez (born 1 August 1965) is a former Spanish footballer who played as a forward.

Club career
Alcañiz began his career at hometown club Castellón, making his debut during the 1983–84 Segunda División season. In 1985–86, Alcañiz was the Segunda División's top scorer, scoring 23 goals. In 1986, Alcañiz signed for Valencia, winning the 1986–87 Segunda División in his first season with the club. Alcañiz stayed with the club for two more seasons, before returning to Castellón in 1989. Alcañiz stayed for two seasons with Castellón in his second stint at the club, making 54 league appearances, scoring 13 La Liga goals. In 1991, Alcañiz signed for Segunda División B club Villarreal, winning promotion to the Segunda División in 1992. At the end of the 1993–94 season, Alcañiz retired, after 246 senior league appearances, scoring 77 goals.

In 1996, Alcañiz came out of retirement for a third spell with Castellón. The following year, Alcañiz became player-manager of CF Benlloch, remaining at the club for four seasons. Alcañiz finished his playing career with Almazora.

International career
Alcañiz represented Spain's under-21's four times in the 1986 UEFA European Under-21 Championship.

References

1965 births
Living people
Spanish footballers
Spanish football managers
Sportspeople from Castellón de la Plana
Uruguay international footballers
Association football forwards
Defensor Sporting players
Albacete Balompié players
CD Castellón footballers
Valencia CF players
Villarreal CF players
La Liga players
Segunda División players
Segunda División B players
Spain under-21 international footballers